John Fawcett may refer to:

John Fawcett (theologian) (1739–1817), British theologian, pastor and hymn writer
John Fawcett (of Bolton) (1789–1867), composer/musician
John Fawcett (organist) (1825–1857), his son, English organist
John Fawcett (actor died 1793), British actor
John Fawcett (actor) (1768–1837), his son, English actor and playwright
John Fawcett (director) (born 1968), Canadian director of film and television
John Fawcett (entrepreneur) (born 1977), American technology businessman
John Fawcett (surgeon) (1866–1944), English surgeon 
John C. Fawcett (1859–1908), American Boston harbor pilot

See also

John Faucette, American science fiction writer
John Fawcett Gordon (1879–1965), politician in Northern Ireland